The Barbary striped grass mouse (Lemniscomys barbarus) is a small rodent of the suborder Myomorpha. This monotypic species is native to coastal Morocco, Algeria and Tunisia in northwest Africa. In the past it was believed to also occur throughout a large part of Sub-Saharan Africa, but these populations are now treated as a separate species, the Heuglin's striped grass mouse (L. zebra). These relatively small Lemniscomys are among the species most commonly kept in captivity.

The Barbary, Heuglin's and Hoogstral's striped grass mouse (L. hoogstraali) form a group that have a distinctly dark and light striped pelage. Other Lemniscomys either have more spotty/interrupted stripes or only a single dark stripe along the back.

References 

Lemniscomys
Rodents of North Africa
Mammals described in 1766
Taxa named by Carl Linnaeus